Crystal Springs is an unincorporated community in Kidder County, North Dakota, United States.

A post office called Crystal Springs was established in 1884, and remained in operation until 1993. The community took its name from nearby Crystal Springs Lakes.

See also 
 Crystal Springs Fountain: nearby fountain on the National Register of Historic Places

References

Unincorporated communities in Kidder County, North Dakota
Unincorporated communities in North Dakota